Portuguese South Africans are South Africans of Portuguese ancestry. The exact figure of how many people in South Africa are Portuguese or of Portuguese descent are not accurately known as many people who arrived during the pre-1994 era quickly assimilated into English and Afrikaner speaking South African communities. There was likely also an undercount of immigrants, especially from Madeira.

History
The Portuguese explored the coasts of South Africa in the late 15th century, and nominally claimed them as their own with the erecting of padrões (large stone cross inscribed with the coat of arms of Portugal placed there as part of a land claim). Bartolomeu Dias did so in 1486, and Vasco da Gama recorded a sighting of the Cape of Good Hope in 1497, en route to India.

The early 20th century witnessed a trickle of emigrants from Madeira whose numbers greatly increased in the decades following World War II. Madeiran immigrants, who are traditionally associated with horticulture and commerce, form the largest group within South Africa's Portuguese community.

The largest single event of Portuguese settlement occurred when the former Portuguese colonies became independent in 1975. Most of them went to Portugal and Brazil, but a significant number of black and white refugees from Angola and Mozambique made their way to South Africa. Their arrival made South Africa the home of the largest Portuguese African population, increasing it from about 49,000, to 300,000.

Politics and economics

The Portuguese South African community is highly active within the South African community, both politically and economically. Notable members include Maria Ramos who was the former director general of South Africa's National Treasury and later Group CEO of ABSA, one of South Africa's largest financial services companies. Other Portuguese involvement within the business community includes companies like Mercantile Bank. The community is also actively involved in investment activities with other Southern African countries like Angola and Mozambique.

Socially, the Portuguese community have held an annual festival called Lusito Land (the second largest festival in South Africa).

Religion
Most Portuguese, like other South Africans, are Christians. Most of them are Roman Catholics, although there is a Protestant minority.

Sports

Football
The most popular sport with Portuguese South Africans is football. There are many football clubs in South Africa that are of Portuguese origin. One example was the professional football club Vasco Da Gama which dissolved in 2016. Football is a favourite pastime for Portuguese youth in South Africa, and many of them tend to join amateur and professional football clubs in the country.

Geography
Due to Portuguese exploration and navigation many points of interest on the South African coast have Portuguese names.
KwaZulu-Natal 
Cape Agulhas 
Benguela Current 
Agulhas Current 
Dias Cross
Da Gama Cross
L'Agulhas 
Agulhas National Park
Saldanha Bay
St Lucia, KwaZulu-Natal
Algoa Bay
St. Croix Island
St Helena Bay

Notable Portuguese South Africans

 João Albasini (1813–1888) 
 Basil D'Oliveira (1931-2011), a cricketer known for initiating the D'Oliveira affair 
 Manuel de Freitas, Member of Parliament, Shadow Minister of Tourism since 2019, Shadow Minister of Transport from 2014 to 2019, Shadow Minister of Home Affairs from 2012 to 2014, Shadow Deputy Minister of Transport from 2009 to 2012, previously councillor in the City of Johannesburg and also a Member of the Gauteng Provincial Legislature.
 Trevor Manuel, former Minister of Finance and Minister in the Presidency for the National Planning Commission
 Vasco da Gama, speaker of the Johannesburg City Council
 Jeannie de Gouveia (better known as Jeannie D), TV presenter and media personality
 Roger De Sá, former footballer and coach
 Edgar Fernando Ferreira Maia (Born 1986), Blade master in martial arts
 Vanessa Do Céu Carreira, Miss South Africa 2001
 Mike dos Santos, strategist, dancer and writer
 Fernando Duarte, co-founder of Nando's
 Sonia Esgueira, actress and writer of the satirical comedies "Porra" and "Porralicious"
 Manny Fernandes, professional boxing promoter
 Frank Pereira, former footballer
 Maria Ramos, Chief Executive Officer of Barclays Africa Group Limited
 Marilyn Ramos, Miss South Africa 2012
 Paula Reto, professional golfer 
 João Silva, photographer
 Lee Cole, singer and songwriter
 Colonel Ignatius Ferreira, played a prominent role in the development of Johannesburg
 Shevon Pereira, Miss South Africa 2020 Top 35 and Miss South Africa 2022 Top 30.
 Savannah de Almeida, Miss South Africa 2021 top 35
 Costa Titch, amapiano artist
 Manuel Escórcio a South African tenor

See also

Portuguese Africans
Portuguese Angolans
Portuguese Mozambicans
Portuguese people
White South Africans
White Africans
Portuguese Americans

References

External links
The Portuguese in South Africa
Portugueses na Africa do Sul

 
 
Ethnic groups in South Africa
Portuguese diaspora in Africa
 Portuguese